Snook is a city in Burleson County, Texas, United States. The population was 506 at the 2020 census.

Snook is home to Frank Sodolak of Sodolak's Original Country Inn, the inventor and first known restaurant to serve chicken fried bacon. Snook is also home to Slovacek Sausage Company.

Snook is the home of Chilifest, an annual charity event held since 1991 that attracts some of the biggest names in country music for a two-day chili cook-off and concert. This event attracts more than 50,000 people each year. According to the event's web site, Chilifest has donated more than $3,500,000 to area organizations such as Burleson County Go-Texan, the Boys & Girls Club of Brazos Valley and the Snook Volunteer Fire Department.

Geography

Snook is located in eastern Burleson County at  (30.490162, –96.469804).

Demographics

As of the 2020 United States census, there were 506 people, 236 households, and 159 families residing in the city.

As of the census of 2000, there were 568 people, 221 households, and 160 families residing in the city. The population density was 282.6 people per square mile (109.1/km). There were 252 housing units at an average density of 125.4/sq mi (48.4/km). The racial makeup of the city was 75.70% White, 21.13% African American, 0.18% Asian, 2.64% from other races, and 0.35% from two or more races. Hispanic or Latino of any race were 10.39% of the population.

There were 221 households, out of which 37.6% had children under the age of 18 living with them, 51.6% were married couples living together, 17.2% had a female householder with no husband present, and 27.6% were non-families. 24.0% of all households were made up of individuals, and 10.9% had someone living alone who was 65 years of age or older. The average household size was 2.57 and the average family size was 3.03.

In the city, the population was spread out, with 29.6% under the age of 18, 10.6% from 18 to 24, 27.3% from 25 to 44, 19.2% from 45 to 64, and 13.4% who were 65 years of age or older. The median age was 32 years. For every 100 females, there were 90.0 males. For every 100 females age 18 and over, there were 84.3 males.

The median income for a household in the city was $34,722, and the median income for a family was $37,656. Males had a median income of $31,528 versus $23,125 for females. The per capita income for the city was $14,965. About 14.7% of families and 16.9% of the population were below the poverty line, including 18.9% of those under age 18 and 11.8% of those age 65 or over.

Education
Snook is served by the Snook Independent School District and home to the Snook Secondary School Bluejays.

Notable people

 Leighton Schubert, state representative for District 13; former Snook resident

References

External links
 Chilifest

Cities in Burleson County, Texas
Cities in Texas
Bryan–College Station